Four Winds Dowagiac is a  casino in Dowagiac, Michigan which opened on April 30, 2013. It is one of the Four Winds Casinos, which are all owned and operated by the Pokagon Band of Potawatomi Indians.

The design of the casino was inspired by the traditions of the Potawatomi people.

Gaming 
The  gaming floor features 404 slot machines and seven table games: 21+3 and Lucky Lucky Bonus Blackjack, High Card Flush, Mississippi Stud, and Roulette. The Four Winds Casinos loyalty program, the W Club, is in use at this property. In 2021 the Michigan Gaming Control Board gave approval to the Pokagon to begin online and sports betting in all three Four Winds casino locations.

Dining 
The casino includes a 30-seat restaurant with an attached 15 seat bar.

See also 

 Four Winds Casinos
 List of casinos in Michigan

References

External links 
 

2013 establishments in Michigan
Buildings and structures in Cass County, Michigan
Casinos in Michigan
Casinos completed in 2013
Native American casinos
Tourist attractions in Cass County, Michigan
Native American history of Michigan
Pokagon Band of Potawatomi Indians